The Sonata is a 2018 mystery thriller film, directed by Andrew Desmond, from a screenplay by Desmond and Arthur Morin. It stars Freya Tingley, Simon Abkarian, James Faulkner, Rutger Hauer, Matt Barber and James Kermack. It was released in the United States on January 10, 2020, by Screen Media Films. It grossed $146,595 at the box office and received mixed reviews from critics.

Plot

Cast
 Freya Tingley as Rose Fisher
 Simon Abkarian as Charles Vernais
 James Faulkner as Sir Victor Ferdinand
 Rutger Hauer as Richard Marlowe
 Matt Barber as James
 Catherine Schaub-Abkarain as Thérèse
 Christopher Brand as The Notary
 James Kermack as The Sound Engineer
 Myster Jo as Tobacco Shop Owner
 Laine Ligere Stengrévica as Meredith
 Aurélija Pronina as Ghost Child #1
 Andrejs Zikovs as Ghost Child #2
 Maija Cipste as Ghost Child #3
 Artüra Ghoss as Ghost Child #4
 Jurijs Krüze as Taxi Driver
 Janis Libietis as Customer #1
 Atis Afréds Brasmanis as Customer #2
 Olga Svecova as Bar Waitress
 Aleksandrs Mihailovs as Barman
 Alina Vasijeva as Rose Violin Double

Release
The Sonata was released in Russia by Screen Media Films on November 15, 2018 and in the United States on January 10, 2020.

Reception
On Metacritic , the film has a weighted average score of 41 out of 100, based on 8 critics, indicating "mixed or average reviews".

References

External links

 
 The Sonata at Rotten Tomatoes

2018 films
2010s mystery films
2018 thriller films
American mystery films
American thriller films
2010s American films